Robert N'Diaye (born 3 February 1942) is a Senegalese former wrestler who competed in the 1972 Summer Olympics and in the 1976 Summer Olympics.

References

1942 births
Living people
Olympic wrestlers of Senegal
Wrestlers at the 1972 Summer Olympics
Wrestlers at the 1976 Summer Olympics
Senegalese male sport wrestlers
Serer sportspeople
20th-century Senegalese people
21st-century Senegalese people